Panoquina lucas, the purple-washed skipper, is a species of grass skipper in the butterfly family Hesperiidae. It is found in the Caribbean Sea, Central America, North America, and South America.

The MONA or Hodges number for Panoquina lucas is 4121.

Subspecies
These two subspecies belong to the species Panoquina lucas:
 Panoquina lucas lucas (Fabricius, 1793)
 Panoquina lucas woodruffi Watson, 1937

References

Further reading

External links

 

Panoquina
Articles created by Qbugbot
Butterflies described in 1793